Roxana Saberi (born April 26, 1977) is an American CBS News correspondent and former Miss North Dakota pageant winner. In 2009, she was held prisoner in Iran's Evin Prison for 101 days under accusations of espionage. She subsequently wrote a book about the experience.

On April 8, 2009, the Iranian government charged Saberi with espionage, which she denied. She was subsequently convicted and sentenced to an eight-year prison term. An appeals court reduced the charge against her from espionage to possessing classified information, a charge which she also denied, and reduced her eight-year prison term to a two-year suspended sentence. She was released on May 11, 2009.

Biography

Early life
Saberi was born in Belleville, New Jersey, the daughter of Reza Saberi, who was born in Iran, and Akiko Saberi, who emigrated from Japan. When she was six months old, her family moved to Fargo, North Dakota. Graduating with honors from Fargo North High School in 1994, Saberi played piano and soccer, and took part in Key Club and danceline. Saberi was inducted into the school's Hall of Fame in 2007.

She graduated in 1997 from Concordia College in Moorhead, Minnesota, with degrees in Communication and French. Saberi also played for the Cobbers soccer team from 1994 to 1996.

Chosen as Miss North Dakota in 1997, she was among the top ten finalists in Miss America 1998, winning the Scholar Award. Saberi holds a master's degree in broadcast journalism from Northwestern University and a second master's degree in international relations from the University of Cambridge, where she played for the university soccer team and the King's College, Cambridge, soccer team. She was working on another master's degree in Iranian studies at the time of her arrest.

Career
Saberi moved to Iran in 2003. US-based Feature Story News (FSN) distributed her reports to a wide range of broadcasters around the world, and Saberi's work soon became circulated to the viewers and listeners of Channel News Asia, South African Broadcasting, DW Radio, Vatican Radio, Radio New Zealand, Australian Independent Radio News, and others. She also made occasional contributions to PBS, NPR, and Fox News.

In 2006, the Iranian authorities revoked Saberi's press accreditation and closed the FSN bureau in Iran. She maintained a second press accreditation, permitting her to freelance in Iran for the BBC. In late 2006, it was also revoked. Following the revocation of her second press accreditation, Saberi cut ties with the BBC but continued to file occasional reports from the country for NPR, IPS and ABC Radio.

Iranian trial and imprisonment, and calls for release

Saberi was arrested on January 31, 2009. On March 3, 2009, an Iranian judiciary spokesman confirmed that Roxana Saberi had been arrested on the orders of the Islamic Revolutionary Court. Although Saberi holds both Iranian and American citizenship, Iran does not recognise dual citizenship.

On March 10, a number of international news organisations wrote an open letter to the Iranian government, calling on Iran to allow independent access to Saberi. Signatories included President of NPR Vivian Schiller, President of ABC News David Westin, Wall Street Journal Editor-in-Chief Robert Thomson, John Stack of Fox News, and Jon Williams (world editor at the BBC). The open letter expressed deep concern about Saberi's well-being and "the deprivation of her rights":

After more than five weeks' captivity, on March 8, Saberi was allowed to see an attorney for the first time. On March 18, marking 47 days of detention, the Saberi family called on Iran's supreme leader, Ayatollah Ali Khamenei, to intervene during the run-up to the Persian Nowruz holiday. The US administration expressed its concern at Saberi's detention, dismissing allegations against her as "baseless". US Secretary of State Hillary Clinton demanded her release. On April 6, her parents were allowed a 30-minute visit to Saberi in Evin Prison, where she was being held.

On April 8, the Iranian government charged Saberi with espionage, while the Iranian Students News Agency, quoting a hard-line judge who is the deputy head of Iran's prosecutor's office, said Saberi had "accepted" the accusation of espionage. Saberi's father, who was in Iran at the time but was not allowed into the courtroom, told NPR his daughter was coerced into making incriminating statements. "They told her if she made the statements they would free her," he said. "It was a trick." The court sentenced her to eight years in prison, which her lawyer Abdolsamad Khorramshahi promised to appeal.

Switzerland represents United States interests in Iran, as Iran and the United States do not presently have diplomatic relations. US State Department spokesman Robert Wood raised questions about the transparency of Iran's Islamic Revolutionary Court judicial system, commenting that a Swiss representative was not allowed in the courtroom during Saberi's trial.

On April 19, 2009, President Mahmoud Ahmadinejad said that Saberi must have her legal right to defend herself. He wrote to the prosecutors: "Please, personally observe the process to ensure that the defendants are allowed all legal rights and freedom in defending themselves and that their rights are not violated even by one iota". It was reported on April 21 that Nobel Peace Prize laureate Shirin Ebadi's organization, Human Rights Defenders, would defend Saberi during her appeal. This appointment was never completed, amid reports of objections by Iranian authorities.
On April 21, 2009, Bahman Ghobadi, an Iranian film director, published a letter declaring Saberi's innocence and urging those who knew her to step in and defend her.

Hunger strike
On April 25, 2009, the BBC reported that Saberi's father, Reza Saberi, said he had received word from his daughter that she had been on a hunger strike for the past five days. At the end of two weeks, she told him she had discontinued the hunger strike.

During this time, her situation was followed closely by Amnesty International, Human Rights Watch, the Asian American Journalists Association, Committee to Protect Journalists, Society of Professional Journalists, and UNITY: Journalists of Color, Inc. Amnesty International later named her a prisoner of conscience.

Release
On May 10, 2009, Saberi's appeal was heard by an Iranian appeals court. The court reportedly dismissed the charges against her on the grounds that the US is not a hostile country because it is not at war with Iran. Her original conviction was on the charges that she was working with a "hostile country" – the United States.

On May 11, 2009, Saberi was freed from prison after the appeals court suspended her eight-year jail sentence. An appeals court reduced the charge against her from espionage to possessing classified information, a charge Saberi denied, and reduced her eight-year prison term to a two-year suspended sentence.

After her release, Saberi said that although she was not physically tortured during her captivity, she was placed under "severe psychological and mental pressure". She said her captors blindfolded her during days of interrogation, held her in solitary confinement, and would not allow her to inform anyone of her whereabouts. According to Saberi, her interrogators threatened her with many years in prison and even execution if she did not confess to being a spy. She said that under these pressures, she had made a false confession, which she later recanted while still in custody.

After Saberi was released from prison, one of her lawyers declared that she had obtained a classified document while working as a translator for a powerful clerical lobby. He claimed that this had been used as evidence to convict her on charges of espionage. He said the document was a classified Iranian report on the US-led war in Iraq.

Saberi later said "I didn't have any classified documents. I had a research article that was public information, but my captors lied and claimed I had a classified document, evidently to pretend that there was legitimacy to my case." Saberi has suggested that the lawyer may have been under pressure from the Iranian government to say after her release that the document was classified, even though in court he had argued that it was not.

Life after imprisonment
Since her release, Saberi wrote a book about her experiences in Iran, Between Two Worlds: My Life and Captivity in Iran, which was released by HarperCollins on March 30, 2010. She has also been speaking out for Iran's "prisoners of conscience" as well as the Iranians who have been detained in the aftermath of the 2009 Iranian presidential election.

Saberi's awards include the 2008 Medill Medal of Courage, the 2009 Ilaria Alpi Freedom of the Press Award, the 2009 NCAA Award of Valor, and a 2010 Project on Middle East Democracy Award.

In 2013 Saberi was hired by Al Jazeera America as a correspondent and senior producer.

Saberi joined CBS News in January 2018 and is based in London.

Works
 Between Two Worlds: My Life and Captivity in Iran. Harper 2010,

See also
 Freedom of the press as a human rights issue in Iran
 Iran–United States relations
 Iranian American
 Japanese American
 2009 detention of American hikers by Iran
 List of foreign nationals detained in Iran

References

External links

 Former official website (archived) of Roxanna Saberi
 Roxana Saberi updates at the Committee to Protect Journalists
 Roxana Saberi and USCIRF Call for Release of Iranian Baha’is (US Commission on International Religious Freedom, July 9, 2009)

1977 births
Living people
Al Jazeera people
CBS News people
Alumni of Hughes Hall, Cambridge
American people convicted of spying for the United States by the Islamic Republic of Iran
American radio reporters and correspondents
American writers of Japanese descent
Amnesty International prisoners of conscience held by Iran
BBC newsreaders and journalists
American women's soccer players
Soccer players from New Jersey
Soccer players from North Dakota
Women's association football midfielders
Concordia Cobbers women's soccer players
Medill School of Journalism alumni
Miss America 1998 delegates
NPR personalities
People from Belleville, New Jersey
Writers from Fargo, North Dakota
People from Grand Forks County, North Dakota
American writers of Iranian descent
Journalists from North Dakota
People convicted of espionage in Iran
American people imprisoned abroad
American women television journalists
American women radio presenters
Inmates of Evin Prison